Cherokee County Airport  is a county-owned public use airport in Cherokee County, Texas, United States. It is located six nautical miles (11 km) southeast of the central business district of Jacksonville, Texas.

Although most U.S. airports use the same three-letter location identifier for the FAA and IATA, this airport is assigned JSO by the FAA and JKV by the IATA (which assigned JSO to a heliport in Södertälje, Sweden).

Facilities and aircraft 
It has one asphalt paved runway designated 14/32 which measures 5,011 by 75 feet (1,527 x 23 m).

For the 12-month period ending September 16, 2008, the airport had 12,350 aircraft operations, an average of 33 per day: 99.6% general aviation and 0.4% military. At that time there were 8 aircraft based at this airport: 88% single-engine and 13% multi-engine.

References

External links 
 

Airports in Texas
Buildings and structures in Cherokee County, Texas
Transportation in Cherokee County, Texas